Karlene Shaye White (born 13 November 1996), known as Karli White, is an American professional soccer player who last played as a forward for Eredivisie (women) club, PEC Zwolle.

College career
White played collegiate soccer at Seattle University and Western Washington University.

Seattle Redhawks
White played for the Seattle Redhawks women's soccer team in her freshman and sophomore years. In her freshman year, White was named in the First Team All-Conference and the WAC All-Tournament Team. In 2016, during her sophomore years, White helped lead Seattle University to the 2016 WAC Women's Soccer Tournament championship.

Western Washington Vikings
White played for the Western Washington Vikings women's soccer team in her junior and senior years. During her junior year, White was named as the GNAC Tournament MVP. White was also named in the GNAC All-Conference First team (Newcomer of the Year), D2CCA All-West Region First team, and United Soccer Coaches All-West Region First team. In 2018, White did not play her senior year due to foot injury which made her eligible as a redshirt for the 2019 season. In her redshirt-senior year, White was named as the GNAC Player of the Year and the GNAC Tournament MVP. She helped lead Western Washington University to the finals of the NCAA Division 2 Women's Soccer Championship and to the 2019 GNAC Women's Soccer Tournament title.

Club career

Youth
White had her youth career at FC Alliance and Crossfire Redmond

Jumonji Ventus
In 2020, White signed for Nadeshiko League Division 2 club, Jumonji Ventus.

PEC Zwolle
In September 2021, White signed for Eredivisie (women) club, PEC Zwolle. She made her league debut for the club in a 1–1 draw against Heerenveen, coming in as a substitute, replacing Jeva Walk in the 61st minute.

International career

Philippines
White was included in Philippines squad for a month-long training camp in Australia.

Coaching career

Seattle Pacific Falcons
In 2022, White started as an assistant coach for the women's soccer team of Seattle Pacific University.

References

External links
 
 

Living people
Citizens of the Philippines through descent
Filipino women's footballers
Women's association football forwards
American women's soccer players
Seattle Redhawks women's soccer players
American people of Filipino descent
American sportspeople of Filipino descent
1996 births